Red Voice Choir is an American progressive dark rock band formed in Oakland, California, United States, in 2005. Members are: Miss Kel (vocals and keyboards), Adam Beck (vocals and guitar), Dawn Hillis (bass) and Kevin Brown (drums).

Line-up
The current line-up features Miss Kel (of Black Ice and the now defunct Sister Mary Shoelace), Adam Beck (of Death of a Party), Dawn Hillis (formerly of The Holy Kiss) and Kevin Brown (of Black Ice, and now defunct: The Freaks, Sister Mary Shoelace, and The Legendary Freemonious Wah), although the band originally began with Skot B. (of Black Ice, The Phantom Limbs and Anal Kitties) as the drummer. Their first CD EP, "A Thousand Reflections" was released by Atakra Productions on July 9, 2007.  On February 3, 2008, Red Voice Choir played its last show at 924 Gilman in Berkeley, California.  According to their Myspace page, they are mixing a 5-song recording to be released posthumously.

Style
The band has been described as experimental, progressive dark rock, among others, with a wide range of influences, and features a mash-up of loud and quiet music with the contrast of screaming vocals against soothing harmonies and melodies.

External links
 Red Voice Choir's Myspace page
 Black Ice's official website
 Death of a Party's official website
 Atakra Productions official website

American gothic rock groups
American death rock groups
American post-punk music groups
Progressive rock musical groups from California